Eliza Haycraft (1820-1871), was a wealthy brothel madam and philanthropist, who donated money to the widows and orphans of the American Civil War.

Biography
Haycraft was born on the 14th of February, 1820. She moved to St. Louis, Missouri from Callaway County, Missouri in 1840, reportedly arriving in a canoe. She fled her original home after being cast out by her parents, because she was seduced by a lover at the age of twenty. She arrived in St. Louis destitute, with only the option of selling herself as a courtesan.

Haycraft took advantage of the brief legalization of prostitution in her city, and soon became the owner and manager of a brothel, doing well in business despite her inability to read and write. She signed her name with an "X", and avoided using banks. She bought commercial and residential property, and rented it back out. By the time the Civil War had started, she had two working operations in the continually-growing St. Louis. At the end of the war, she had five. Throughout her career, she was known for being a generous philanthropist, refusing to turn away the city's poor, offering them help and financial aid.

In 1870, her health began to decline, and she died on December 5, 1871, at the age of 51. She left an estate valued at over a quarter million dollars, about 30 million U.S dollars today. More than 5,000 people attended her funeral, and she was buried without a marker in the Bellefontaine Cemetery, in a lot that could have held twenty-one people. She still does not have a headstone.

In popular culture
In February 2019, auditions were announced for the world premier of Madam!, "a new musical based loosely on real events" of Haycraft's life with music, words, and book by Colin Healy to debut August 2019.
Madam runs at Bluff City Theater in Hannibal MO from August 15- August 24, 2019.

References

American brothel owners and madams
American prostitutes
People from Missouri
1820 births
1871 deaths
Women in the American Civil War
19th-century American philanthropists
19th-century American businesspeople
19th-century American businesswomen